Martin Hutton (born January 21, 1982) is an American former soccer player, who last played for Houston Dynamo of Major League Soccer in 2006.

Youth
Hutton was born in New Orleans, Louisiana. When he was twelve, Hutton's family moved from Louisiana to Spring, Texas where he played club soccer with the Houston Texans.  Hutton attended Klein High School where he played soccer under coach Allen Baker.  He became the only freshman to start in Klein's history and became the only freshman goalkeeper to win a state championship when Klein took the 1997 Texas 5A State Championship.  Klein repeated as state champion in 1999 while Hutton earned regional and state MVP honors in 1999.

U-16 & U-17 national teams
Hutton was part of the U-16 National Team, as well as, the inaugural U.S. residency program with the U.S. U-17s in Bradenton, Florida. Played with Donavan, Beasley, Bekerman, Convey, and Onyewu as part of the 17s. As an amateur he was part of the U.S. Amateur National team from 2001-2003 gaining experience and getting wins against several MLS teams.

College
Hutton began his collegiate soccer career at Clemson University from in 2000.  He redshirted his first season due to injury and played in 5 matches the next year before transferring to Saint Louis University after the 2001 season.  He spent the next 3 years in Saint Louis where he started 50 of 54 games accumulating 205 saves, 14 shutouts, and a goals against average of 1.03. Ranks among the top ten lists in several categories.

Professional
Upon graduating from Saint Louis in 2005, he was signed by the Kansas City Wizards to a developmental contract and was placed on their reserve squad.  He failed to break into the first team and spent the preseason training with the Houston Dynamo before the Wizards traded him to the Dynamos for a fourth round pick in the 2007 MLS Supplemental Draft.  In June 2006 season, the Dynamo sent Hutton on loan to the Portland Timbers. Unfortunately for Hutton, Houston had two very competent goalkeepers in front of him, 2003 MLS Goalkeeper of the Year Pat Onstad and Zack Wells, and the young keeper did not get any playing time in the 2006 season.

Retirement
The Dynamo released Hutton before the 2007 preseason.  After a trial with the USL First Division team Miami FC and contemplating other offers, Hutton decided to retire and return St. Louis University as a graduate assistant under the tutelage of head coach Dan Donigan. He is currently pursuing an M.B.A in finance and is the goalkeeper coach of Saint Louis University men's soccer team, as well as, SLSG Metro of the U.S. Development Academy Program.

External links
 St. Louis Billikens profile

References

1982 births
Living people
Sportspeople from Harris County, Texas
Sportspeople from New Orleans
American soccer players
Association football goalkeepers
Colorado Rapids U-23 players
Clemson Tigers men's soccer players
Saint Louis Billikens men's soccer players
Soccer players from Louisiana
Sporting Kansas City players
Houston Dynamo FC players
American soccer coaches
Saint Louis Billikens men's soccer coaches
Portland Timbers (2001–2010) players
USL First Division players
USL League Two players
People from Spring, Texas